Russia (officially the Russian Federation) became an independent state in the 20th century when it emerged as the successor of the Soviet Union in 1991.

1991 - 1992 - 1993 - 1994 - 1995 - 1996 - 1997 - 1998 - 1999
2000

See also
21st century in Russia